is a Japanese anime television series based on both Tales of Zestiria and Tales of Berseria video games developed by Bandai Namco Studios and tri-Crescendo, and published by Bandai Namco Entertainment. It is produced by Ufotable, directed by Haruo Sotozaki and written by Hikaru Kondo, featuring character designs by Akira Matsushima and music by Motoi Sakuraba and Go Shiina. The anime series is split into two halves: the first half premiered on July 3, 2016 and finished airing on September 25, 2016. The second half premiered on January 8, 2017 and finished airing on April 29, 2017.

Plot
Tales of Zestiria the X takes place in a world where there are beings called Seraphim. Humans and Seraphim used to live together in harmony thousands of years ago. The humans prayed to the Seraphim, and in return the Seraphim blessed them. The Seraphim have magical powers and their own element to control. Earth, wind, water, or fire. There were thousands of Seraphim, but mankind was awash with terrible emotions, and could easily be overcome and turn into monsters. When Seraphim became too connected to a human, seeing their friend physically and mentally turn into a monster caused them to despair and their ephemeral forms were quickly turned into monsters as well. The monsters were created when an area was thick with negative emotions that created a dangerous byproduct called malevolence. Malevolence turns any weak or negative living creature into a monster. While Seraphim are turned into powerful dragons, all other living creatures are turned into monsters called Hellions when they are taken over by malevolence.

The Seraphim kept nature running smoothly and in balance, while a person called the Shepherd kept the malevolence at bay. The Shepherd is a regular person until they are able to pull a sacred sword from a stone. Then they become a living legend with the power to purify all Hellions. They can form contracts with Seraphim and combine their bodies so they can use their elemental powers to purify dangerous creatures. They can also form contracts with humans, who help carry the burden of malevolence. While forming contracts with Seraphim has no adverse consequences, humans are a different story. Should the Shepherd die, so will the humans that have a contract with him or her. Also, the more humans the Shepard has contracts with, the heavier the burden on the Shepherd. They can weigh him or her down and cause problems if there are too many.

All of this is a simple legend, of course, no one's seen a Shepherd or Seraphim in hundreds of years. The legend says, humans became too self-absorbed and malevolent and therefore lost the ability to see a Seraphim's ephemeral form. That all changes when a certain princess stumbles across a young man who's lived in a Seraphim village his entire life and can see, touch and talk to them just as easily as he does humans. He has a dream to create a world in which Seraphim and humans can coexist again, but he doesn't have the power to act on his desires. The world is falling into darkness and the malevolence that the humans are blissfully unaware of is dangerously close to destroying everyone. How will the princess and her new optimistic friend fair in this world of monsters and mayhem?

Characters

Zestiria characters

Voiced by: Robbie Daymond (English); Ryōhei Kimura (Japanese)

Voiced by: Philip Lamont (English); Ryōta Ōsaka (Japanese)

Voiced by: Alexis Tipton (English); Ai Kayano (Japanese)

Voiced by: Carrie Keranen (English); Noriko Shitaya (Japanese)

Voiced by: Caitlin Glass (English); Mikako Komatsu (Japanese)

Voiced by: Kira Buckland (English); Misato Fukuen (Japanese)

Voiced by: Chris Niosi (English); Daisuke Ono (Japanese)

Voiced by: Ian Sinclair (English); Kenjiro Tsuda (Japanese)

Berseria characters

Voiced by: Rina Satō

Voiced by: Daisuke Kishio

Voiced by: Satomi Satō

Voiced by: Tomoaki Maeno

Voiced by: Satomi Arai

Production and release
An anime television series adaptation of the video game, titled Tales of Zestiria the X, which is animated by Ufotable, was announced at the Tales of Festival 2015. The original plans for the anime was about Tales of Berseria and its promotion before its release, hence the reason why the game makes an adapted appearance. The series is directed by Haruo Sotozaki and written by Ufotable staff. Akira Matsushima adapted the original character designs for the anime, while the art director is Minji Kim. The music is composed by Motoi Sakuraba and Go Shiina. The main voice actors from the game reprised their roles in the series except for Lailah's voice actress Miyu Matsuki, who died in 2015 and was replaced by Noriko Shitaya. The series was originally announced for broadcast sometime in July 2016.

The first half of the anime television series adaptation aired from July 3, 2016 to September 25, 2016. The opening theme song for the first half was "Kaze no Uta" by Flow, while the ending theme was "Calling" by Fhána. The second half aired from January 8, 2017 to April 29, 2017. The opening theme for the second half is "Illuminate" by Minami Kuribayashi and the ending theme is "Innosense" by Flow.

The anime had been licensed by Funimation and by Madman Entertainment for streaming. Following Sony's acquisition of Crunchyroll, the series was moved to Crunchyroll. Daisuki later added the series to their streaming service, via Anime Consortium Japan alongside Rewrite, Fate/Grand Order ~First Order~ and Blue Exorcist Kyoto Saga.

Episode list

Season 1

Season 2

Notes

References

External links
  
 

Anime television series based on video games
Crunchyroll anime
Ufotable
Tales (video game series)
Tokyo MX original programming
Works based on Bandai Namco video games